Karol Stopa (born 12 March 1948) is a Polish sports journalist, commentator and tennis player.

References 

Living people
1948 births
Polish journalists
Polish male tennis players
21st-century Polish people